Ausgang was an English gothic rock band formed in Birmingham, England in 1983.

History
Ausgang formed from the ashes of previous band Kabuki. Some members had also been members of another band, the Solicitors. Max (vocals), Cub (bass guitar) and Matthew (guitar) were all previously in Kabuki, who released one 1982 single ("I Am a Horse") before splitting up. With drummer Ibo, they formed Ausgang and played their first gig in September 1983 at the Powerhouse in Birmingham. They toured with The Cult before signing to Criminal Damage Records, who released their debut EP, The Teachings of Web, in 1984. Their next release, the "Solid Glass Spine" 7" single,  reached No. 28 on the UK Indie Chart. Their final release that year, the Head On ! EP, was produced by Andi Sex Gang.

Cub was replaced by Stu, and Ausgang signed to FM Records, who issued the Hunt Ya Down EP in 1985, followed by the band's debut album, Manipulate, in January 1986. The band and label parted ways, and after a tour with Gene Loves Jezebel, Ausgang set up their own Shakedown label, returning with the "King Hell" 12" single later that year.

Inspired by a friend who had painted the slogan on his jacket, the band briefly lengthened their name to Ausgang-a-Go-Go in an attempt to break away from their goth reputation, releasing the Los Descamisados mini-LP under that name in 1987 before splitting up. A cassette-only collection of demos, In Retrospect (Out Of Our Minds), was released that year on the Fourth Dimension label.

In 2001, Anagram Records issued a collection, Last Exit... The Best of Ausgang.

Reunion
Ausgang reformed in 2003, and issued the Licked album in 2005. The reunited band played at several editions of the Drop Dead Festival, including New York City in 2004 and 2006, and Prague in 2007.

Discography

Studio albums
Manipulate (1985, FM)
Licked (2005, Shakedown)

Singles and EPs
The Teachings of Web 12" EP (1984, Criminal Damage)
"Solid Glass Spine" 7" single (1984, Criminal Damage)  
Head On ! 12" EP (1984, Criminal Damage)
Hunt Ya Down 12" EP (1985, FM)
"Bad Hand" flexi 7" single (1986, Fourth Dimension)  
"King Hell" 12" single (1986, Shakedown)
Los Descamisados mini-LP (1987, Shakedown) as Ausgang-A-Go-Go

Compilation albums
In Retrospect (Out Of Our Minds) cassette (1987, Fourth Dimension) 
Last Exit... The Best of Ausgang (2001, Anagram)

References

External links
Official website
Fan site
Ausgang at Deathrock.com
Review of Licked at Starvox.net

English gothic rock groups
Musical groups from Birmingham, West Midlands